Charles McLay (circa 1860 – 2 May 1918) was a Scottish-born architect in Queensland, Australia. Some of his works are now heritage-listed.

Architectural career 
After working for a number of years in the Public Works Department in the Queensland Government Architect's Office, McLay entered into a partnership with Henry Wallace Atkinson in 1906, trading as Atkinson and McLay.

Other interests 
McLay joined the Naval Defence Force as a sub-lieutenant on 6 May 1898 and was promoted to lieutenant on 31 October 1901. He was commander when he was placed on the retired list of the Australian Naval Brigade on 15 January 1910. Following the resignation of Robin Dods, McLay was appointed Diocesan Architect to the Anglican Diocese of Brisbane in 1916; it passed to Atkinson after McLay's death in 1918.

Later life 
McLay died suddenly at his home on 2 May 1918. His funeral was held on 3 May 1918 and he was buried in Bulimba Cemetery.

Significant works
 1886: Customs House, Brisbane
 1889: Stewart's Creek Gaol, in the Queensland Colonial Architect's Office
1890-1891: Queensport Hotel (now Queensport Tavern),  49 Gibson Road, Murarrie
 1895: Lady Norman Wing of the Brisbane General Hospital, with John James Clark
 1910: Ithaca Town Council Chambers, as Atkinson and McLay
 1912: McWhirters Department Store, as Atkinson and McLay
 1916: Bandstand at Eagle Farm Racecourse, as Atkinson and McLay

See also 
 List of Australian architects

References

Architects from Brisbane
1918 deaths
Burials in Balmoral Cemetery, Brisbane
Year of birth uncertain
Royal Australian Navy officers